Turmel is a surname. Notable people with the surname include:

 John Turmel (born 1951), Canadian politician
 Lucy Turmel (born 1999), English squash player
 Nycole Turmel (born 1942), Canadian politician